Disgraceful is a 1995 album by British band Dubstar. It is also their debut and was released in October 1995 on the Food Records label, a division of EMI that was also home to Blur.

The album features two covers; "Not So Manic Now" which was originally recorded by Brick Supply on their 1994 EP Somebody's Intermezzo, and "St. Swithin's Day" which was originally recorded by Billy Bragg on his 1984 album Brewing Up with Billy Bragg.

Artwork censorship
Disgraceful'''s cover underwent a revision after some time on general release.  The original cover—pictured here—contained a furry blue pencil case with a balloon inside, creating a somewhat labia-like effect. This was later revised to the current, slightly less blatant bunny slipper design.

Critical reception
A reviewer from British magazine Music Week'' wrote, "Delicate, poignant pop from the Gateshead trio, with Sarah Blackwood's voice soaring above synthesised melodies and strings."

Track listing
All tracks written by Steve Hillier except where noted.
"Stars" – 4:09
"Anywhere" (Hillier, Chris Wilkie) – 3:39
"Just a Girl She Said" (Sarah Blackwood, Hillier, Wilkie) – 4:39
"Elevator Song" – 2:54
"The Day I See You Again" – 4:20
"Week in Week Out" (Blackwood, Hillier, Wilkie) – 4:28
"Not So Manic Now" (Harling, Kirby, Mason, Robinson) – 4:29
"Popdorian" – 2:53
"Not Once, Not Ever" – 3:50
"St. Swithin's Day" (Bragg) – 4:01
"Disgraceful" – 3:50

Personnel
Dubstar
Sarah Blackwood – vocals
Steve Hillier – songwriting & programming
Chris Wilkie – guitar

Additional personnel
Jon Kirby – additional arrangements and keyboards
Audrey Riley – cello
Andy Duncan – percussion
Graeme Robinson – drums
Phil Spalding – bass
Stephen Hague – accordion

References

External links

Disgraceful at YouTube (streamed copy where licensed)

1995 debut albums
Dubstar albums
Albums produced by Stephen Hague